Diah Permata Megawati Setiawati Sukarnoputri (born 23 January 1947) is an Indonesian politician who served as the fifth president of Indonesia from 2001 to 2004. She previously served as the eighth vice president from 1999 to 2001.

Megawati is Indonesia's first female president and the sixth woman to lead a Muslim-majority country. She is also the first Indonesian president and as of 2022 the only vice president to be born after Indonesia proclaimed its independence in 1945. After serving as vice president to Abdurrahman Wahid, Megawati became president when Wahid was removed from office in 2001. She ran for re-election in the 2004 presidential election, but was defeated by Susilo Bambang Yudhoyono. She ran again in the 2009 presidential election, but Yudhoyono defeated her for a second time.

She is the first and current (as of 2022) leader of the Indonesian Democratic Party of Struggle (PDI-P), one of Indonesia's largest political parties. She is the eldest daughter of Indonesia's first president, Sukarno.

Name
Her name, Sukarnoputri (meaning 'daughter of Sukarno'), is a patronym, not a family name; Javanese often do not have family names. She is often referred to as simply Megawati or Mega, derived from Sanskrit meaning 'cloud goddess'. In a speech to the students of the Sri Sathya Sai Primary School, she mentioned that Indian politician Biju Patnaik named her at Sukarno's request.

Early life and education (1947–1987)

Early life 

Megawati was born in Yogyakarta to Sukarno, who had declared Indonesia's independence from the Netherlands in 1945 and Fatmawati, one of his nine wives. Megawati was Sukarno's second child and first daughter. She grew up in her father's Merdeka Palace. She danced for her father's guests and developed a gardening hobby. Megawati was 19 when her father relinquished power in 1966 and was succeeded by a government which eventually came to be led by President Suharto.

Education 
Megawati attended Padjadjaran University in Bandung to study agriculture but dropped out in 1967 to be with her father following his fall. In 1970, the year her father died, Megawati went to the University of Indonesia to study psychology but dropped out after two years.

Early political career (1987–1999)

Member of parliament

Tenure 

In 1986, Suharto gave the status of Proclamation Hero to Sukarno in a ceremony attended by Megawati. Suharto's acknowledgment enabled the Indonesian Democratic Party (PDI), a government-sanctioned party, to campaign on Sukarno nostalgia in the lead-up to the 1987 legislative elections. Up to that time, Megawati had seen herself as a housewife, but in 1987 she joined PDI and ran for a People's Representative Council (DPR) seat. The PDI accepted Megawati to boost their own image. Megawati quickly became popular, her status as Sukarno's daughter offsetting her lack of oratorical skills. Although PDI came last in the elections, Megawati was elected to the DPR. Like all members of the DPR she also became a member of the People's Consultative Assembly (MPR).

Indonesian Democratic Party chair

Election as chair 
Megawati was not reelected, but continued as a PDI member. In December 1993, the PDI held a national congress. As was always the case when New Order opposition parties held their congresses, the government actively interfered. As the Congress approached, three individuals contended for the PDI chair. The incumbent, Suryadi, had become critical of the government. The second was Budi Harjono a government-friendly figure whom the government backed. The third was Megawati. Her candidacy received such overwhelming support that her election at the Congress became a formality.

When the congress assembled, the government stalled and delayed attempts to hold the election. The congress faced a deadline when their permit to assemble would run out. As the hours ticked down to the end of the congress, troops began gathering. With only two hours remaining, Megawati called a press conference, stating that because she enjoyed the support of a majority of PDI members, she was now the de facto chair. Despite her relative lack of political experience, she was popular in part for her status as Sukarno's daughter and because she was seen as free of corruption with admirable personal qualities. Under her leadership, PDI gained a large following among the urban poor and both urban and rural middle classes.

Party split 
The government was outraged at its failure to prevent Megawati's rise. They never acknowledged Megawati although her self-appointment was ratified in 1994. In 1996, the government convened a special national congress in Medan that reelected Suryadi as chair. Megawati and her camp refused to acknowledge the results and the PDI divided into pro-Megawati and anti-Megawati camps.

27 July 1996 Incident 
Suryadi began threatening to take back PDI's Headquarters in Jakarta. This threat was carried on the morning of 27 July 1996. Suryadi's supporters (reportedly with the Government's backing) attacked PDI Headquarters and faced resistance from Megawati supporters stationed there. In the ensuing fight, Megawati's supporters held on to the headquarters. A riot ensued, followed by a government crackdown. The Government later blamed the riots on the People's Democratic Party (PRD), and continued to recognize Suryadi's faction as the official party.

1997 legislative election 
Despite what seemed to be a political defeat, Megawati scored a moral victory and her popularity grew. When the time came for the 1997 legislative election, Megawati and her supporters threw their support behind the United Development Party (PPP), the other approved opposition party.

Reformasi

1999 Legislative election 
In mid-1997, Indonesia began to be affected by the Asian Financial Crisis and showed severe economic distress. By late January 1998 the rupiah fell to nearly 15,000 against the US dollar, compared to only 4,000 in early December. Increasing public anger at pervasive corruption culminated with Suharto's resignation and the assumption of the presidency by Vice President B. J. Habibie in May 1998, starting the Reform era (Reformasi). The restrictions on Megawati were removed and she began to consolidate her political position. In October 1998, her supporters held a National Congress whereby Megawati's PDI faction would now be known as the Indonesian Democratic Party of Struggle (PDI-P). Megawati was elected Chair and was nominated as PDI-P's presidential candidate.

PDI-P, together with Abdurrahman Wahid's National Awakening Party (PKB) and Amien Rais' National Mandate Party (PAN), became the leading reform forces. Despite their popularity, Megawati, Wahid and Rais adopted a moderate stance, preferring to wait until the 1999 legislative election to begin major changes. In November 1998, Megawati, together with Wahid, Rais and Hamengkubuwono X reiterated their commitment to reform through the Ciganjur Statement.

Result 
As the elections approached, Megawati, Wahid and Amien considered forming a political coalition against President Habibie and Golkar. In May, Alwi Shihab held a press conference at his house during which Megawati, Wahid and Amien were to announce that they would work together. At the last minute, Megawati chose not to attend, because she decided that she could not trust Amien. In June, the elections were held and PDI-P came first with 33% of the votes.

With the victory, Megawati's presidential prospects solidified. She was opposed by PPP who did not want a female president. In preparation for the 1999 MPR General Session, PDI-P formed a loose coalition with PKB. As the MPR General Session approached, it seemed as if the presidential election would be contested between Megawati and Habibie, but by late June Amien had drawn the Islamic parties into a coalition called the Central Axis. The presidential election became a three-way race when Amien floated the idea of nominating Wahid for president; but Wahid did not provide a clear response to the proposal.

1999 Indirect presidential election

Election of Wahid as president 
Megawati's PDI-P and PKB coalition faced its first test when the MPR assembled to choose its Chair. Megawati threw her support behind Matori Abdul Djalil, the Chair of PKB. He was overwhelmingly defeated by Amien, who in addition to enjoying Central Axis support was backed by Golkar. The Golkar and Central Axis coalition struck again when they secured Akbar Tanjung's election as Head of DPR. At this stage, people became wary that Megawati, who best represented reform, was going to be obstructed by the political process and that the status quo was going to be preserved. PDI-P supporters began to gather in Jakarta.

Habibie made a poorly received speech on political accountability that led him to withdraw. The presidential election held on 20 October 1999 came down to Megawati and Wahid. Megawati took an early lead, but was overtaken and lost with 313 votes compared to Wahid's 373. Megawati's loss provoked her supporters to revolt. Riots raged in Java and Bali. In the city of Solo, PDI-P masses attacked Amien's house.

Selection as vice president 
The next day, the MPR assembled to elect the vice president. PDI-P had considered nominating Megawati, but were concerned that the Central Axis and Golkar coalition would again thwart her. Instead, PKB nominated Megawati. She faced stiff competition from Hamzah Haz, Akbar Tanjung and General Wiranto. Well aware of the riots, Akbar and Wiranto withdrew. Hamzah stayed in the race, but Megawati defeated him 396 to 284. In her inauguration speech, she called for calm.

Vice president (1999–2001)

Tenure
As vice president, Megawati had considerable authority by virtue of her commanding many seats in the DPR. Wahid delegated to her the problems in Ambon, although she was not successful. By the time the MPR Annual Session assembled in August 2000, many considered Wahid to be ineffective as president or as an administrator. Wahid responded to this by issuing a presidential decree, giving Megawati day-to-day control of the government.

2000 PDI-P National Congress
The First PDI-P Congress was held in Semarang, Central Java, in April 2000, at which Megawati was re-elected as Chair for a second term.

Megawati consolidated her position within PDI-P by taking harsh measures to remove potential rivals. During the election for the Chair, two other candidates emerged; Eros Djarot and Dimyati Hartono. They ran because they did not want Megawati to serve concurrently as both chair and vice president. Eros' nomination from the South Jakarta branch was voided by membership problems. Eros was not allowed to participate in the Congress. Disillusioned with what he perceived to be a cult of personality developing around Megawati, Eros left PDI-P. In July 2002, he formed the Freedom Bull National Party. Although Dimyati's candidacy was not opposed as harshly as Eros, he was removed as Head of PDI-P's Central Branch. He kept his position as a People's Representative Council (DPR) member, but left the party to become a university lecturer. In April 2002, Dimyati formed the Our Homeland of Indonesia Party (PITA).

Relationship with Wahid and rise to the presidency

Megawati had an ambivalent relationship with Wahid. During the Cabinet reshuffle of August 2000 for example, Megawati was not present for the announcement of the new line-up. At another occasion, when the political tide began to turn against Wahid, Megawati defended him and lashed out against critics. In 2001, Megawati began to distance herself from Wahid as a Special Session of the MPR approached and her prospects of becoming president improved. Although she refused to make any specific comments, she showed signs of preparing herself, holding a meeting with party leaders a day before the Special Session was to start.

Presidency (2001–2004)

Tenure 

On 23 July 2001, the People's Consultative Assembly (MPR) removed Wahid from office and subsequently swore in Megawati as the new president. She thus became the sixth woman to lead a Muslim-majority country. On 9 August 2001, she announced her Mutual Assistance Cabinet.

The rise of an icon of opposition against the Suharto regime to the presidency was initially widely welcomed, however it soon became apparent that her presidency was marked with indecisiveness, lack of clear ideological direction, and "a reputation for inaction on important policy issues". The good side of slow progress of reforms and avoiding confrontations was that she stabilized the overall democratization process and relationship between legislative, executive, and military.

She ran for election in the country's first direct presidential election in 2004, hoping to become the first woman elected in her own right as head of state in a Muslim-majority country. However, she was decisively defeated by Susilo Bambang Yudhoyono in the second round, by 61 percent to 39 percent, on 20 September 2004. She did not attend the new president's inauguration, and never had congratulated him.

Post-presidency (2004–present)

Leader of the PDI-P

2009 general elections
On 11 September 2007 Megawati announced her candidacy in the 2009 presidential election
at a PDI-P gathering. Soetardjo Soerjoguritno confirmed her willingness to be nominated as her party's presidential candidate. Her nomination for president was announced on 15 May 2009, with Gerindra Party leader Prabowo Subianto as her running mate.

Megawati's 2009 race was overshadowed by her calls to change Indonesia's voter registration procedure, obliquely suggesting that Yudhoyono's supporters were trying to manipulate the vote. Megawati and Prabowo lost the election to Yudhoyono, coming in second with 26.79% of the vote.

2014 general elections

On 24 February 2012, Megawati distanced herself from polls that placed her as a top contender for the 2014 presidential election. Megawati, still Chair of PDI-P, appealed to her party at a gathering in Yogyakarta to focus on PDI-P's current priorities. Nonetheless, a domain name appeared to have been registered in her name. On 27 December 2012, the daily edition of the Jakarta Post hinted at a possible reconciliation in the 2014 general election between the families of Megawati and President Susilo Bambang Yudhoyono and their political parties, her Indonesian Democratic Party of Struggle (PDI-P) and his Democratic Party respectively.

For 2014 general election, Megawati's party and their coalition partners nominated Joko Widodo as their candidate for president. Widodo defeated his opponent Prabowo Subianto in a hotly contested election. Later, the relationship between Megawati and Widodo became strained as she pushed for Police Commissary General Budi Gunawan, for the post of the Indonesian Police Chief, despite him being investigated for corruption by the Corruption Eradication Commission (KPK). Budi Gunawan was Megawati's Adjutant during her tenure as Indonesian president.

At the 4th of PDI-P National Congress on 20 September 2014, Megawati was reappointed as Chair of PDI-P for the year of 2015–2020.

Post-Presidency Appointments 

So far, only Megawati is a former Indonesian president which somehow retained her influence to a ruling government and even appointed to strategic positions with advisory capabilities. On 22 March 2018, she was appointed as Head of Steering Committee of Pancasila Ideology Development Agency. She also gained position as Head of National Research and Innovation Agency Steering Committee since 5 May 2021, and she was formally appointed on 13 September 2021.

Personal life

Megawati's first husband was First Lieutenant , whom she married on 1 June 1968. He perished in a plane crash in Biak, West Irian, on 22 January 1970. On 27 June 1972, she married Hassan Gamal Ahmad Hassan, an Egyptian diplomat. The marriage was annulled by the Religious Court less than 3 months later. She then married Taufiq Kiemas on 25 March 1973. He died on 8 June 2013. She had three children, Mohammad Rizki Pratama, Muhammad Prananda Prabowo, and Puan Maharani. The sons are from her marriage with Surindro, while Puan is the only child from Megawati's marriage to Taufiq.

Awards

National honours 
  Star of the Republic of Indonesia, 1st Class (8 August 2001)
  Star of the Republic of Indonesia, 2nd Class (3 February 2001)
  Star of Mahaputera, 1st Class (3 February 2001)
  Star of Merit, 1st Class (8 August 2001)
  Star of Culture Parama Dharma (8 August 2001)
  Star of Yudha Dharma, 1st Class (8 August 2001)
  Star of Kartika Eka Paksi, 1st Class (8 August 2001)
  Star of Jalasena, 1st Class (8 August 2001)
  Star of Swa Bhuwana Paksa, 1st Class (8 August 2001)

Foreign honours 
:
 Order of Friendship (2 June 2021)

References

Further reading
 
 Gerlach, Ricarda (2013): 'Mega' Expectations: Indonesia's Democratic Transition and First Female President. In: Derichs, Claudia/Mark R. Thompson (eds.): Dynasties and Female Political Leaders in Asia. Berlin et al.: LIT, p. 247–290.
 Skard, Torild (2014) "Megawati" in Women of power – half a century of female presidents and prime ministers worldwide. Bristol: Policy Press, .
 Wichelen, Sonja van (University of Amsterdam). "Contesting Megawati: The Mediation of Islam and Nation in Times of Political Transition." Westminster Papers in Communication and Culture. 2006 (University of Westminster, London), Vol. 3(2): 41–59. ISSN 1744-6708 (Print); 1744–6716 (Online). p. 41–59.

External links

." (Archive) Westminster Papers in Communication and Culture. 2006 (University of Westminster, London), Vol. 3(2): 41–59. ISSN 1744-6708 (Print); 1744–6716 (Online). p. 41–59.
 Gerlach, Ricarda (2013): 'Mega' Expectations: Indonesia's Democratic Transition and First Female President. In: Derichs, Claudia/Mark R. Thompson (eds.): Dynasties and Female Political Leaders in Asia. Berlin et al.: LIT, p. 247–290.
 Skard, Torild (2014) "Megawati" in Women of power – half a century of female presidents and prime ministers worldwide. Bristol: Policy Press, .
. Forbes.
Karon, Tony. "The Princess Who Settled for the Presidency." TIME Magazine. Friday 27 July 2001.
Biography of Megawati Soekarnoputri at SekolahVirtual

|-

|-

|-

|-

1947 births
21st-century Indonesian politicians
21st-century Indonesian women politicians
Articles containing video clips
Balinese people
Candidates in the 2009 Indonesian presidential election
Children of national leaders
Female heads of government
Female heads of state
Indonesian Democratic Party of Struggle politicians
Indonesian Muslims
20th-century Indonesian women politicians
20th-century Indonesian politicians
Javanese people
Living people
Politicians from Yogyakarta
Presidents of Indonesia
Sukarno family
Sukarno
Vice presidents of Indonesia
Women presidents
Women vice presidents
Members of the People's Representative Council, 1987
Women members of the People's Representative Council